Franz may refer to:

People 
 Franz (given name)
 Franz (surname)

Places 
 Franz (crater), a lunar crater
 Franz, Ontario, a railway junction and unorganized town in Canada
 Franz Lake, in the state of Washington, United States – see Franz Lake National Wildlife Refuge

Businesses 
 Franz Deuticke, a scientific publishing company based in Vienna, Austria
 Franz Family Bakeries, a food processing company in Portland, Oregon
 Franz-porcelains, a Taiwanese brand of pottery based in San Francisco

Other uses 
 Franz (film), a 1971 Belgian film
 Franz Lisp, a dialect of the Lisp programming language

See also
 Frantz (disambiguation)
 Franzen (disambiguation)
 Frantzen (disambiguation)